The Alan Hotel was a hotel located in the Little Tokyo neighborhood in Downtown Los Angeles, California. The hotel was established in 1942, and was built directly across from the noted Civic Center Mall.  Its address was 236 East Second Street.

The hotel was noted for housing a large population of African-Americans, and figured prominently in the alleged attempted assassination of Jimmy Carter in May 1979. The hotel was demolished in 1986 following a lawsuit demanding eviction settlements for the displaced residents, and to prepare for the construction of the Parker Center.

References

Buildings and structures demolished in 1986
Hotels established in 1942
Hotel buildings completed in 1942
1986 disestablishments in California
Little Tokyo, Los Angeles
1942 establishments in California
Demolished hotels in Los Angeles